Yury Mikhaylovich Kublanovsky (30 April 1947 in Rybinsk) is a Russian poet, essayist, critic and art historian, known for his dissident past, started in the informal literary union SMOG. The author of dozens of lyrical books appearing in America, France, and Russia.

Biography 
Yuri Kublanovsky was born in the family of the actor and teacher of Russian literature. His grandfather, a priest, was shot in 1930. In the house of his grandmother kept the atmosphere of pre-revolutionary Russia. Despite the fact that his parents were communists, he was baptized.

He was fond of painting, with 10 years of experience in the art studio at one time wanted to be a painter. Poems, by his own admission, he began to write in 14–15 years. He started with the avant-garde, considering that resist official Soviet literature can only be non-traditional ways. He took the example of appearing in print the early years of thaw in Western surrealists, Russian futurists. In 1962 he went to Moscow and showed his poems to Andrey Voznesensky. He approved it.

From October 1982 to 1990 he lived as an emigre (Paris, Munich). Joseph Brodsky and Solzhenitsyn praised the poet.

Kublanovsky has received the Solzhenitsyn Prize, Mandelstam Prize, New Pushkin Prize.
In 2016 he became a member of the Board of Trustees Fazil Iskander International Literary Award

Poem books 
 Избранное. — Ann Arbor: Ardis, 1981;
 С последним солнцем. — Paris: La Presse Libre, 1983 (afterword by Joseph Brodsky);
 Оттиск. — Paris: YMCA-Press, 1985;
 Затмение. — Paris, YMCA-Press, 1989;
 Возвращение. — Moscow: Правда, 1990;
 Оттиск. — Moscow, 1990;
 Чужбинное. — Moscow: Моск. рабочий, 1993;
 Число. — Moscow: изд-во Московского клуба, 1994;
 Памяти Петрограда. — Saint Petersburg: Пушкинский фонд, 1994;
 Голос из хора. — Paris-Moscow-New-York, 1995;
 Заколдованный дом. — Moscow: Русский путь, 1998;
 Дольше календаря. — Moscow: Русский путь, 2001;
 В световом году. — Moscow: Русский путь, 2001. — ;
 На обратном пути. — Moscow: Русскій міръ, 2006. — ;
 Дольше календаря. — Moscow: Время, 2006;
 Перекличка. — Moscow: Время, 2009;
 Посвящается Волге. — Rybinsk: Медиарост, 2010;
 Изборник. — Irkutsk: Издатель Сапронов, 2011;
 Чтение в непогоду: Избранное. — Moscow: Викмо-М; Русский путь, 2012, — , 978-5-85887-422-5.
 Неисправные времена. — М.: Вифсаида: Русский путь, 2015. — .
 Долгая переправа: 2001—2017. — М.: Б.С.Г.-Пресс, 2017. — .
 Crépuscule d'impressioniste. — Париж: Le Castor Astral, 2018. — .

References 

 Literary evenings "This Summer in Irkutsk-2011": Yuri Kublanovsky "Reading in Bad Weather"
 Once a Dissident, Always a Dissident // Russia profile
 Evgeniĭ Bunimovich, J. Kates Contemporary Russian Poetry: An Anthology, p. 482

1947 births
Living people
People from Rybinsk
Russian male poets
Soviet dissidents
Soviet emigrants to France
Soviet emigrants to Germany
Solzhenitsyn Prize winners